Basing Hill Park is a small public park in Childs Hill in the London Borough of Barnet. Together with the neighbouring Childs Hill Park it is one of Barnet's 'Premier Parks'. It is mainly grassed with scattered trees, a multipurpose tennis court/football pitch, basketball court, baseball pitch and a children's playground.
There is also bicycle rider training in the park on Saturdays, April to November. 

The area was open fields until the 1920s, when it was developed for housing, and in 1936 the ground was laid out as a park to serve the local people.

There is access from Wayside and Hendon Way.

See also
 Barnet parks and open spaces

References

External links
 London Borough of Barnet, Basing Hill Park
 London Gardens Online, Basing Hill Park
 Kids Fun London, Basing Hill Park

Parks and open spaces in the London Borough of Barnet